Dave's Guitar Shop is a musical instrument store with three locations in Wisconsin. The company sells guitars, amplifiers and other guitar-related accessories. The La Crosse location houses a multi-million dollar guitar and amplifier museum which is open to the public.

History
Dave Rogers started his guitar business by selling instruments out of his home, opening his first store in La Crosse, Wisconsin in 1982 at the former location of a Shakey's Pizza Parlor. In 2017, Rogers expanded Dave's La Crosse location and Coalition Drum Shop relocated within the expanded store. The store in La Crosse now carries an inventory of over 3,000 guitars.

In 2017, the company opened a second retail location in Milwaukee, carrying over 400 guitars and specializing in guitar repair. In October 2019, the Milwaukee store relocated to a larger building.

In 2018, Dave's opened its third retail location in Madison. While this store's product offerings and repair services are similar to the company's other stores, it specialize in boutique acoustic guitar manufacturers like Goodall, Huss & Dalton, Flammang, and Collings Guitars.

Locations
La Crosse, Wisconsin, opened in 1982
Milwaukee, Wisconsin, opened May 2017
Madison, Wisconsin, opened June 1, 2018
Marshfield, Wisconsin Opened August 2022

The Museum
The original Dave's Guitar Shop in La Crosse houses a guitar and amplifier museum on the second floor. There are more than 300 vintage guitars and amplifiers in the museum. There are individual guitars in the museum that are valued at $500,000. The entire collection is open to the public.

See also
Warman's Vintage Guitars Field Guide: Values and Identification by Dave Rogers

References

Musical instrument retailers of the United States
Companies based in Wisconsin
American companies established in 1982
Retail companies established in 1982
Museums in La Crosse County, Wisconsin
1982 establishments in Wisconsin
Museums established in 1982
La Crosse, Wisconsin
Music museums in the United States